The 2009 Monza Superbike World Championship round was the fifth round of the 2009 Superbike World Championship season. It took place on the weekend of May 8–10, 2009 at Monza.

Results

Superbike race 1
Race 1 was stopped before the end of the first lap because of an accident on the first corner that left debris and oil on the track. It was later restarted but Max Neukirchner, Brendan Roberts and Makoto Tamada were not able to restart due to the injuries suffered in the crash. Neukirchner suffered a broken right femur and a dislocation to his right foot, while Roberts suffered bruising, and Tamada suffered a broken wrist. All three riders have been ruled out of the next round at Kyalami.

Max Biaggi was given a 20-second penalty for cutting a chicane.

Superbike race 2
Shane Byrne was given a 20-second penalty for cutting a chicane. Ride through penalties were given for the same reason to Yukio Kagayama, Vittorio Iannuzzo, David Checa and David Salom. Iannuzzo was black-flagged for ignoring the penalty. Troy Corser did not race due to injuries suffered in both starts of the first race, and also missed the following round at Kyalami.

Supersport race

References

 Superbike Race 1 (Archived 2009-07-31)
 Superbike Race 2
 Supersport Race

External links
 The official website of the Autodromo Nazionale Monza
 The official website of the Superbike World Championship

Monza Round
Monza